Simon Paulet (born 15 February 2000) is a Belgian professional footballer who plays as a midfielder for Challenger Pro League club Virton, on loan from Belgian First Division A club Westerlo.

Club career
In 2018, Paulet joined the youth academy of English second division side Swansea City, where he suffered a hamstring injury.

In 2020, Paulet signed for Westerlo in the Belgian First Division B, debuting against Deinze. 

On 22 July 2022, Paulet joined Challenger Pro League club Virton on a one-season loan.

Hoours 
Westerlo
 Belgian First Division B: 2021–22

References

External links
 
 

2000 births
Living people
Belgian footballers
Belgium youth international footballers
Association football midfielders
K.V.C. Westerlo players
R.E. Virton players
Challenger Pro League players
Belgian expatriate footballers
Expatriate footballers in Wales
Belgian expatriate sportspeople in Wales
Footballers from Hainaut (province)
Sportspeople from Mons